The Fly also known as "Buck Horn Lake" is a small lake in Otsego County, New York. It is located northeast of Unadilla. The Fly drains south via an unnamed creek which flows into Susquehanna River.

References 

Lakes of New York (state)
Lakes of Otsego County, New York